Irina Mutsuovna Khakamada (born April 13, 1955, in Moscow) is a Russian economist, political activist, journalist, publicist, and politician who ran in the 2004 Russian presidential election.

Khakamada was a former member (deputy) of the lower house (the State Duma) of the Russian parliament for three convocations (electoral terms, 1993–2003) and Vice-Chair of the house; co-chair of a political party Union of Right Forces (1999–2003), presidential candidate of the Russian Federation (2004), member of the Presidential Council for the Development of Civil Society and Human Rights (2012–2018).

In 1995, Time named Khakamada a 21st-century politician among 100 well-known women in the world.

In 2002, Khakamada served as a rapporteur from Russia at the 57th session of the UN General Assembly. 2005 she was nominated for the Nobel Peace Prize.

Biography
Khakamada was born to a Japanese father, Mutsuo Hakamada, a communist who defected to the Soviet Union in 1939. Her mother, Nina Sinelnikova, with Russian, Lezgian and Armenian roots, was an English schoolteacher who lost her father to the Stalinist purges and her mother to suicide following the family's forced relocation to Khabarovsk.

The Russia expert and political science professor Shigeki Hakamada is her half-brother.

Khakamada graduated from the Department of Economy of the Patrice Lumumba Peoples' Friendship University in Moscow in 1978. She obtained her PhD degree from the Faculty of Economics of Lomonosov Moscow State University. In 1983, she received the academic title of associate professor in the specialty "political economy". She was a member of the CPSU from 1984 to 1989.

Duma career
Khakamada was an elected Duma representative from 1993 to 2003. She is regarded as a democratic politician who is in a moderate opposition to the Russian government. She is known for criticizing the governmental actions during Moscow theater hostage crisis where she was involved as one of the negotiators. Khakamada stated that the hostage takers were not going to use their bombs to kill the people and destroy the building.

Khakamada was a member of the coordinating council of the Union of Right Forces. She opted to abstain from the council's vote on their endorsement in the 2000 presidential election, in which the party ultimately voted to support Vladimir Putin's campaign over that of council member Konstantin Titov.

2004 presidential campaign

Khakamada was one of the leaders of the Union of Rightist Forces when she decided to run in the 2004 Russian presidential election. She was not supported by her party, which had decided that they would not nominate a candidate. She announced her candidacy in December 2003.

Khakamada kicked off her campaign by delivering a speech which placed the blame for the Moscow theater hostage crisis at Putin's feet. She entered the election with better name recognition than most of the other candidates challenging Putin. Her candidacy was officially registered on 8 February. Khakamada was only the second woman to be a registered candidate in a Russian presidential election, after only Ella Pamfilova in 2000.

Khakamada claimed her motivation for running was her desire to see a liberal opposition candidate. She would ultimately be the only liberal opposition candidate to run.

In an article published in Novaya Gazeta, Yulia Latynina alleged that Khakamada only entered the election to feign a role of a democratic opponent to provide more legitimacy to the election of Vladimir Putin. Khakamada denied such allegations.

Khakamada's campaign slogan was “Irina Khakamada: Our Voice”. Her campaign received funding from Boris Nevzlin, a former Yukos chief who was being targeted for international investigation by Russian authorities and was residing in Israel during the campaign. She was outspoken about unfair conditions of the election, particularly about its media coverage. Early into the campaign, analysts predicted that she might be able to receive more than 10% of the vote. Khakamada received 3.9% of votes. While she declared that she found her performance in the election to have been, "satisfactory", she alleged that there had been many irregularities with the vote.

Subsequent political activities (2004– present)

After the election Khakamada founded a new political party named Our Choice. Since 2004, the chairman of the Party reorganized into the "Our Choice Interregional Public Fund for Social Solidarity", which in 2006 became part of the Russian People’s Democratic Union (RNDS) political party, led by Mikhail Kasyanov and her.

Khakamada published the book "Gender in big-time politics" describing her personal experience of work in Kremlin.

On June 11, 2006, Boris Berezovsky, fugitive from the Russian justice system, said Boris Nemtsov received word from Khakamada that Putin threatened her and like-minded colleagues in person. According to Berezovsky, Putin had issued threats that Khakamada and her colleagues "will take in the head immediately, literally, not figuratively" if they "open the mouth" about the Russian apartment bombings.

Former FSB officer Alexander Litvinenko said he had learned from Anna Politkovskaya that Putin asked Khakamada to pass a threat to Politkovskaya. Khakamada denied her involvement in passing any specific threats, and said that she warned Politkovskaya only in general terms more than a year earlier, and that Politkovskaya blamed her and Mikhail Kasyanov for becoming Kremlin's puppets. Politkovskaya and Litvinenko were murdered in October and November 2006.

2008, Khakamada left the party of her own accord, explaining the cessation of her political activities.

2016, she became a member of the Council of the Political Growth Party. She took part in the elections to the State Duma of the 7th convocation as a candidate from the “Party of Growth”, in the first part of the regional list of Moscow. The party won 1.28% of the vote and was unable to sit in parliament.

Books
1995 - "Common cause" ("Общее дело")
1999 - "Maiden Name" ("Девичья фамилия")
2002 - “Peculiarities of National Politics” ("Особенности национального политика")
2006 - “Sex in big politics. Self-instruction self-made woman " ("Sex в большой политике. Самоучитель self-made woman")
2007 - “Love, out of the game. The story of one political suicide" ("Любовь, вне игры. История одного политического самоубийства")
2008 - "Success in the big city" ("Success [успех] в Большом городе")
2012 - "The Tao of Life: A Master Class from a Staunch Individualist" ("Дао жизни: Мастер-класс от убежденного индивидуалиста")
2014 - “In anticipation of oneself: From image to style” ("В предвкушении себя: От имиджа к стилю")
2017 - "Success. You ask - I answer" ("Успех. Cпрашиваете– отвечаю")
2018 - "Restart: how to live many lives" ("Рестарт: Как прожить много жизней")

Film and television
Khakamada has appeared in several films and television series as an actress, including Brief Guide To A Happy Life in 2012.

References

External links

English
Profile — from mosnews.com
A challenger for the presidency

Russian
Official site
Irina Khakamada about her book 
A chapter from the book 
Another chapter from the book 
Irina Khakamada about hostage crisis, interview by Anna Politkovskaya
Presidential race
Criticism  by Yulia Latynina
Reply to the criticism
Interview - Radio Free Europe
Interview - Radio Free Europe
Interview - Radio Free Europe

1955 births
Living people
Politicians from Moscow
Russian politicians of Japanese descent
Russian people of Armenian descent
Russian people of Lezgian descent
Communist Party of the Soviet Union members
Party of Economic Freedom politicians
Union of Right Forces politicians
Russian People's Democratic Union politicians
Party of Growth politicians
First convocation members of the State Duma (Russian Federation)
Second convocation members of the State Duma (Russian Federation)
Third convocation members of the State Duma (Russian Federation)
Russian artists
Candidates in the 2004 Russian presidential election
Female candidates for President of Russia
Moscow theater hostage crisis
Moscow State University alumni
Peoples' Friendship University of Russia alumni
Economists from Moscow
21st-century Russian women politicians